Halcyon  is an unincorporated community of about 125 acres (50 ha) in San Luis Obispo County, California, just south of Arroyo Grande. It was founded in 1903 as a Theosophical intentional community and is the home and headquarters of a religious organization, The Temple of the People (not to be confused with Jim Jones and the Peoples Temple). The Temple group was founded in 1898.

History 
Halcyon is registered as an Historical Site both Federally and in the state of California. It is the town which contains a community established by a group of Theosophists in the early 1900s, who built a Temple and surrounding buildings. The Temple of the People was founded in Syracuse, New York, in 1898 by William Dower and Francia LaDue, members of the Esoteric Section of the Theosophical Society. It was moved to Halcyon in 1903. Dower, who was a medical doctor, and LaDue founded the Halcyon Hotel and Sanatorium, where all manner of addiction and nervous ailments as well as tuberculosis were treated and which remained open until 1949. Other members of the Temple followed Dower and LaDue to Halcyon from Syracuse, and made their living through farming, poultry, and handicrafts.

Land continued to be acquired by the Temple, whose holdings were at one time much more extensive than present-day Halcyon. A town plan was laid out by the Temple Home Association, which subdivided a portion and sold or leased out home sites. A print shop was established to produce a monthly magazine (which is still published), the Artisan, as well as other Theosophical literature. A general store and post office opened in 1908.

LaDue, who was known in her official capacity as "Blue Star", led the Temple as its first Guardian in Chief until her death in 1922. The Blue Star Memorial Temple building, designed by architect Theodore Eisen of Los Angeles, was constructed in 1923 and named in honor of LaDue. Dower served as the second Guardian until his death in 1937. Pearl Dower was the third Guardian until her death in 1968; during her tenure the William Quan Judge Library was established. Harold Forgostein was the fourth Guardian until his death in 1990. Eleanor Shumway has been the Guardian since that time.

Notable people involved with Halcyon and the Temple include composer and pianist Henry Cowell (see also The Tides of Manaunaun), Irish poet and fiction writer Ella Young, and mystic poet and writer John Varian (1863–1931). Varian's sons, Russell (1898–1959) and Sigurd (1901–1961), who spent part of their childhood in Halcyon, invented the klystron, an important microwave amplifier tube, and founded the Varian electronics empire.

Cethil Mallory, member and building contractor, worked on many of the single-family homes in Halcyon with the help of his three sons, John, David, and Roland.  They helped to rebuild the Halcyon General Store and post office when it was moved one half block south.
 
Halcyon today contains fifty-two single-family homes, of which thirty are owned by the Temple, as well as several small buildings used by the Temple, and just over one hundred residents. Almost all residents earn their living outside the community.

The Temple continues to function today as a small, but international, theosophical society with headquarters at Halcyon. Weekly services at Halcyon are held on Sundays in the Blue Star Memorial Temple building, as well as a fifteen-minute healing service held there every day at noon. Classes occur twice weekly currently online.

Chronological overview  
Guardian in Chief:
 1898–1922 — Francia A. La Due (1849–1922)
 1922–1937 — William H. Dower (1866–1937)
 1937–1968 — Pearl F. Dower
 1968–1990 — Harold E. Forgostein
 1990–present — Eleanor L. Shumway

Footnotes

Further reading

 Robert V. Hine, California's Utopian Colonies. San Marino, CA: Huntington Library, 1953; pp. 54–57.
 Paul Eli Ivey, Radiance from Halcyon: A Utopian Experiment in Religion and Science. Minneapolis, MN: University of Minnesota Press, 2013.

External links
Temple of the People

Theosophical Society
Populated places established in 1898
Utopian communities in California
Unincorporated communities in San Luis Obispo County, California
Arroyo Grande, California
Unincorporated communities in California